Geopora arenicola is a species of fungus belonging to the family Pyronemataceae. It is an uncommon European species.

The fungus forms a rounded ascocarp underground on sandy loam soils.

References

External links

Fungi of Europe
Pyronemataceae
Fungi described in 1848
Taxa named by Joseph-Henri Léveillé